China National Pharmaceutical Group Corporation (CNPGC), commonly referred to as Sinopharm, is a Chinese state-owned enterprise. The corporation was the indirect major shareholder of publicly traded companies Sinopharm Group (via a 51–49 joint venture, Sinopharm Industrial Investment, with Fosun Pharmaceutical),  (mostly via Sinopharm Group Hongkong Co., Ltd.), Shanghai Shyndec Pharmaceutical (via a wholly owned research institute based in Shanghai), and Beijing Tiantan Biological Products (via China National Biotec Group).

China National Pharmaceutical Group was supervised by the State-owned Assets Supervision and Administration Commission of the State Council.

Sinopharm was ranked 109th in the 2021 Fortune Global 500 list.

History
Sinopharm was founded as China National Pharmaceutical Group Corporation on November 26, 1998, as a holding company for China National Pharmaceutical Corporation, China National Pharmaceutical Industry Corporation, China National Pharmaceutical Foreign Trade Corp. and China National Medical Device. In 2009 it was merged with China National Biotec Group.

Its subsidiary Wuhan Institute of Biological Products was fined for selling 400,520 ineffective DPT vaccines in November 2017.

COVID-19 vaccines

The Sinopharm BIBP COVID-19 vaccine, also known as BBIBP-CorV, the Sinopharm COVID-19 vaccine, or BIBP vaccine, is one of two inactivated virus COVID-19 vaccines developed by Sinopharm. It completed Phase III trials in Argentina, Bahrain, Egypt, Morocco, Pakistan, Peru, and the United Arab Emirates (UAE) with over 60,000 participants. BBIBP-CorV shares similar technology with CoronaVac and BBV152, other inactivated virus vaccines for COVID-19.

Peer-reviewed results published in JAMA of Phase III trials in United Arab Emirates and Bahrain showed BBIBP-CorV 78.1% effective against symptomatic cases and 100% against severe cases (21 cases in vaccinated group vs. 95 cases in placebo group). In December 2020, the UAE previously announced interim results showing 86% efficacy. While mRNA vaccines like the Pfizer–BioNTech COVID-19 vaccine and mRNA-1273 showed higher efficacy of over 90%, those present distribution challenges for some nations as they require deep-freeze facilities and trucks. BIBP-CorV could be transported and stored at normal refrigerated temperatures.

BBIBP-CorV is being used in vaccination campaigns by certain countries in Asia, Africa, South America, and Europe.  Sinopharm expects to produce one billion doses of BBIBP-CorV in 2021. On 7 May 2021, the World Health Organization approved the vaccine for emergency use and Sinopharm later signed purchase agreements for 170 million doses from COVAX.

The similarly named Sinopharm WIBP COVID-19 vaccine is also an inactivated virus vaccine.

See also
 CanSino Biologics
 Sinovac

References

External links
 

Government-owned companies of China
Holding companies of China
Pharmaceutical companies of China
Companies based in Beijing
Chinese companies established in 1998
COVID-19 vaccine producers